Lamar, Lamarr or slight variations thereof is a surname of French origins:

Adriana Lamar (1908–1946), Mexican film actress
Ann Hannaford Lamar (born 1952), American judge, Mississippi Supreme Court associate justice
Barbara La Marr (1896–1926), American actress
Bill Lamar (1897–1970), American baseball player
Bo Lamar (born 1951), American basketball player
Burney Lamar (born 1980), American race car driver
Charles Augustus Lafayette Lamar (1825–1865), American businessman, investor in the second last slave ship to bring slaves to America and Confederate officer
Chuck LaMar (born 1956), American baseball executive, first general manager of the Tampa Bay Devil Rays
Dequantes Lamar (born 1989), American rapper known professionally as Rich Homie Quan
Gazaway Bugg Lamar (1798–1874), steamboat pioneer, Wall Street banker, Confederate supporter
Hedy Lamarr (1914–2000), Austrian actress and inventor
Henry Lamar (American football) (1906–1985), American boxing and football coach
Henry Graybill Lamar (1798–1861), American politician and judge
Holly Lamar, American country music singer and songwriter
Howard R. Lamar (1923–2023), American historian
J. Robert Lamar(1866–1923), American politician
Jason Lamar (born 1978), American football player
John Basil Lamar (1812–1878), American politician
Joseph Rucker Lamar, (1857–1916), American judge, United States Supreme Court justice
Kendrick Lamar (born 1987), American hip hop recording artist
Lindsey Lamar (born 1990), American football player
Lucius Quintus Cincinnatus Lamar I (1797–1834), American judge
Lucius Quintus Cincinnatus Lamar II (1825–1893), American politician, United States Supreme Court justice
Mark Lamarr (born 1967), British comedian
Mirabeau B. Lamar (1798–1859), Texan politician, second president of the Republic of Texas
Phil LaMarr (born 1967), American comedian
Tillie Lamar (1865–1891), American college football player
Tre Lamar (born 1996), American football player
William Bailey Lamar (1853–1928), American politician
William H. Lamar (1853–1928), American lawyer and government officeholder

See also
Justice Lamar (disambiguation)

References